Andrey Quintero nickname:  (born August 17, 1985) Olympian and Colombian sailor. He competed at the Summer Olympics in the Men's Laser class.
Work at Dean Corporation Inc, Training Mentoring at USNC, Raleigh EEUU.
Sportman: rowing, cycling, swimming, crossfitter.

References

Living people
Olympic sailors of Colombia
Colombian male sailors (sport)
Sailors at the 2012 Summer Olympics – Laser
1985 births
Sailors at the 2015 Pan American Games
Pan American Games competitors for Colombia